Jesús Flores (born 1984) is Venezuelan-born Major League Baseball player.

Jesús Flores may also refer to:

Jesús Flores (boxer), Mexican boxer
Jesús Flores (diver) (1912–?), Mexican diver
Jesús Flores Magón (1871–1930), Mexican lawyer, journalist and politician
Jesús Morales Flores (born 1946), Mexican PRI politician
Jesús Silva Herzog Flores (1935–2017), Mexican economist and politician